Satavaptan (INN; developmental code name SR121463, former tentative brand name Aquilda) is a vasopressin-2 receptor antagonist which was investigation by Sanofi-Aventis and was under development for the treatment of hyponatremia. It was also being studied for the treatment of ascites. Development was discontinued in 2009.

References 

Diuretics
Tert-butyl compounds
Vasopressin receptor antagonists